Frances Ann Walker was an American chemist known for her work on heme protein chemistry. She was an elected fellow of the American Association for the Advancement of Science and the American Chemical Society.

Education and career 
Walker was born in Ohio and grew up there, graduating from Adena High School in 1958. Walker has a B.A. in chemistry from College of Wooster (1962). In 1966 she earned her Ph.D. in chemistry from Brown University. From 1967 until 1970 she was a postdoctoral fellow at the University of California, Los Angeles and an assistant professor at Ithaca College. She then moved to San Francisco State University where she was promoted to professor in 1976. Subsequently, she moved to the University of Arizona where she was named Regents Professor in 2001, and then she retired in 2013.

Research 
Walker's research centered on bio-inorganic chemistry, especially heme protein chemistry. Walker examined proteins in bloodsucking insects and cytochromes that transfer energy between cells. Walker's early work was on porphyrins and their complexation with iron. She was able to obtain structural information about metal binding proteins. A portion of her work relied on nuclear magnetic resonance, especially paramagnetic nuclear magnetic resonance spectroscopy, which she used to examine model heme and systems with proteins coupled to heme.

Selected publications

Awards and honors 
Walker was elected a fellow of the American Association for the Advancement of Science in 1984. In 2000 she received the Garvan–Olin Medal for scientific accomplishments by a woman chemist from the American Chemical Society. In 2006 she received the Alfred Bader Award in Bioinorganic Chemistry, and in 2011 she was elected a fellow of the American Chemical Society. The Society of Porphyrins and Phthalocyanines awarded her the Eraldo Antonini Award for lifetime achievement award in 2020.

References 

20th-century births
2022 deaths
Scientists from Ohio
Women chemists
Inorganic chemists
University of Arizona faculty
Fellows of the American Association for the Advancement of Science
Brown University alumni
College of Wooster alumni
Fellows of the American Chemical Society